The longsnout prickleback (Lumpenella longirostris), also known as the longsnouted blenny, is a species of marine ray-finned fish belonging to the family Stichaeidae, the pricklebacks and shannies. It is the only species in the monotypic genus Lumpenella. This fish is found in the Arctic and North Pacific Oceans.

References

Lumpeninae
Fish described in 1907
Taxa named by Barton Warren Evermann
Monotypic fish genera